(born Miiko Shikata July 24, 1925 – January 4, 2023) was an American actress, popular for her film and TV roles from the late 1950s until the early 1980s. Her best known role was as an elegant Japanese dancer starring opposite Marlon Brando in the Korean War drama Sayonara. She also acted in several other films and TV shows with fellow performers such as Miyoshi Umeki, James Garner, Bob Hope, Cary Grant, and Toshirō Mifune.

Early years
Taka was born in 1925 in Seattle, but raised in Los Angeles, California as a Nisei; her parents had immigrated from Japan. In 1942, following the signing of Executive Order 9066, she was interned with her family at the Gila River War Relocation Center in Arizona.

Career
After director Joshua Logan's first choice for the role of Hana-ogi, Audrey Hepburn, turned him down, he looked to cast an unknown actress. Taka, who at the time was working as a clerk at a travel agency in Los Angeles, was discovered by a talent scout at a local Nisei festival. Although she had no previous acting experience, Variety gave her a positive review in their review of the film. Warner Bros. gave her a term contract as a result of her performance in Sayonara.

After Sayonara, she worked in films with James Garner, Bob Hope, Cary Grant, Glenn Ford and Toshirō Mifune (alongside whom she also worked in the 1980 television miniseries, Shõgun).  She also served as an interpreter for Mifune as well as Akira Kurosawa when they visited Hollywood.

Personal life
Taka married Japanese-American actor Dale Ishimoto in Baltimore, Maryland, in 1944, and they had one son, Greg Shikata, who works in the film industry, and one daughter. They divorced in 1958.

Taka married Los Angeles television news director Lennie Blondheim in 1963. She resided in Las Vegas, Nevada. Following Blondheim's death, she married Reginald Hsu in 2003.

Taka's death, at the age of 97, was announced by her grandson on January 4, 2023.

Motion pictures

See also
 History of the Japanese in Los Angeles

References

External links

 
 
 

1925 births
2023 deaths
20th-century American actresses
21st-century American women
Actresses from Los Angeles
Actresses from Seattle
American actresses of Japanese descent
American film actors of Asian descent
American film actresses
American television actresses
Japanese-American internees